Shonel Laverne Ferguson MBE (born November 6, 1957 in Nassau) is a former track and field athlete from the Bahamas, who competed in the women's sprint and long jump events during her career.  She is a three-time Olympian (1976, 1984 and 1988).  Ferguson was inducted into the Bahamas Track and Field Hall of Fame in 1993.

She was appointed Member of the Order of the British Empire (MBE) in the 1986 New Year Honours for services to sport.

She served as Free National Movement MP for Fox Hill from 2017 to 2021.

References

External links

Profile

1957 births
Living people
Sportspeople from Nassau, Bahamas
Bahamian female sprinters
Bahamian female long jumpers
Olympic athletes of the Bahamas
Athletes (track and field) at the 1976 Summer Olympics
Athletes (track and field) at the 1984 Summer Olympics
Athletes (track and field) at the 1988 Summer Olympics
Commonwealth Games gold medallists for the Bahamas
Commonwealth Games medallists in athletics
Athletes (track and field) at the 1978 Commonwealth Games
Athletes (track and field) at the 1982 Commonwealth Games
Athletes (track and field) at the 1990 Commonwealth Games
Pan American Games competitors for the Bahamas
Athletes (track and field) at the 1975 Pan American Games
Athletes (track and field) at the 1979 Pan American Games
Athletes (track and field) at the 1983 Pan American Games
World Athletics Championships athletes for the Bahamas
Central American and Caribbean Games gold medalists for the Bahamas
Competitors at the 1978 Central American and Caribbean Games
Central American and Caribbean Games medalists in athletics
Members of the Order of the British Empire
Free National Movement politicians
21st-century Bahamian politicians
21st-century Bahamian women politicians
Members of the House of Assembly of the Bahamas
Medallists at the 1982 Commonwealth Games